Botafuegos Prison is one of the main prisons in Andalusia. ETA (separatist group) members were interred here.

References 

Prisons in Spain